The Miss Nicaragua 2001 pageant, was held on February 3, 2001 in Managua, after several weeks of events.  At the conclusion of the final night of competition, Ligia Cristina Argüello Roa from Managua won the title. She represented Nicaragua at Miss Universe 2001 held in Puerto Rico where she was unplaced and also Miss World 2001 held in Sun City, South Africa where she was in the Top 5 and received the Miss World Americas title. The rest of the finalists would enter different pageants.

Placements

Special awards

 Miss Photogenic - Matagalpa - Karla Leclair Monzón
 Miss Dorian Gray - Jinotega - Indra Palma
 Miss Congeniality - Managua- Leslie Gonzalez
 Miss Internet - Tipitapa - Renee Fabiola Davila (by votes of Global Beauties Webpage)

.

Official Contestants

Judges

 Dennis Davila - Director of Miss Nicaragua Organization
 Lucía Salvo Horvilleur - Nicaragua Minister of Health
 Roberto Courtney -  Regional Director of Ethics and Transparency & (UN) Advisor
 Luisa Amalia Urcuyo -  Miss Nicaragua 1993
 Oscar Miranda - Director of Sales of Televicentro
 Pierre Pierson - Nicaragua Vice-Minister of Culture
 Celia Lacayo - Nicaraguan Painter

Background Music

Opening Show – Ricky Martin - "She Bangs"
Swimsuit Competition – Alice DJ - "Better Off Alone"
Evening Gown Competition – Spanish Romantic Guitar Medley

Special Guests

 Ballet Folklórico Nicaragüense - "Toro Huaco"
 Ballet Lelia Gonzalez - "Paso Doble"
 Luis Enrique Mejia Godoy - "Mayo Canto"

.

References

Miss Nicaragua
2001 in Nicaragua
2001 beauty pageants